Yeterevskaya is a rural locality (a stanitsa) in Mikhaylovka Urban Okrug, Volgograd Oblast, Russia. The population was 794 as of 2010. There are 18 streets.

Geography 
Yeterevskaya is located 39 km northeast of Mikhaylovka. 2-y Ilmensky is the nearest rural locality.

References 

Rural localities in Mikhaylovka urban okrug
Don Host Oblast